The 2014 Oregon State Beavers baseball team represents Oregon State University in the 2014 NCAA Division I baseball season.  The Beavers play their home games at Goss Stadium at Coleman Field and are members of the Pac-12 Conference.  The team is coached by Pat Casey in his 20th season at Oregon State.  The Beavers are coming off a season in which they won the Pac-12 conference with a 24-6 conference record, and made it to the semifinals of the College World Series in Omaha, Nebraska, officially finishing tied for 3rd in the tournament.

Offseason news
On Opening Day, the NCAA announced the decision to declare senior pitcher Ben Wetzler ineligible due to violating NCAA regulations.  When deciding whether to forgo his senior year in favor of playing professionally, Wetzler had contact with an adviser who in turn had contact with a professional organization.  The NCAA declared Wetzler ineligible for 20% of the team's games, making him eligible on Sunday, March 2, a home matchup slated against the Wright State Raiders.

Roster

Coaches

Schedule

Ranking movements

References

Oregon State Beavers baseball seasons
Oregon State
Pac-12 Conference baseball champion seasons
Oregon State Beavers Baseball
Oregon State